Shikwa is a Pakistani television series that was first aired on 11 November 2014, on ARY Digital. It is directed by Rubina Ashraf and written by Sarwat Nazir. It is produced by Humayun Saeed and Shahzad Nasib under Six Sigma Plus.

Plot summary 
Munazza takes the charge as the caretaker of the house after the demise of her husband, Naveed. She being concerned about her young daughters, Meher and Sidra, decides to get Meher married with her cousin Saqib, who is much older than Meher. Meher disapproves of the proposal initially but then suppresses her feelings against her mother's firm decision. This becomes the biggest remorse of Meher's life as her life partner is twice her age.

Cast
 Waseem Abbas as Saqib
 Soniya Hussain as Meher Saqib
 Irsa Ghazal as Munazza
 Asad Siddiqui
 Gohar Rasheed
 Sabahat Ali Bukhari as Zeba
 Badar Khalil as Maimona
 Humaira Ali as Tamanna Khanam
 Qaiser Naqvi as Saqib's Aapa
 Alizeh Tahir as Sidra
 Javed Sheikh as Naveed (dead)
 Emmad Irfani
 Sami Sani

Accolades

Nominations
 Lux Style Awards - Best Television Series - Shikwa
 Lux Style Awards - Best Television Director - Rubina Ashraf

References

External links
Official website

Pakistani drama television series
2014 Pakistani television series debuts
2015 Pakistani television series endings
Urdu-language television shows